The Bergen Museum of Art & Science is temporarily located in cyberspace while its extensive art collection valued at over one million dollars is being stored in an art warehouse in Hackensack, New Jersey, United States. The museum relocated from the Bergen Mall in 2010 is currently undergoing re-organization and is looking for a new building to contain its entire art collection, sculptures, fossils, artifacts, drawings and other items and collectibles.

Exhibitions
Tsugio Hattori

See also
Anderson Outkitchen
Hackensack Bus Terminal
New Bridge Landing
New Jersey Naval Museum

References

Museums in Bergen County, New Jersey
Hackensack, New Jersey
Art museums and galleries in New Jersey
Science museums in New Jersey